Ride with Me may refer to:
 "Ride wit Me", a 2001 song by Nelly
 "Ride with Me" (Steppenwolf song), 1971
 "Ride With Me" (Hey! Say! JUMP song), 2013
 Ride with Me (album), an album by Vanessa Struhler
 Ride with Me, a 2015 album by Baha Men
 "Ride with Me", a 2021 single by Tungevaag featuring Kid Ink